Verticordia sieberi is a flowering plant in the myrtle family, Myrtaceae and is endemic to the south-west of Western Australia. It is a shrub with one main stem, often compact but sometimes openly branched and with pink to pale purple flowers in summer and autumn.

Description
It is sometimes a compact, small shrub but may also be openly branched with the flowers held high above most of the foliage.

Flowering time is usually from November to April but can occur at other times, depending on weather conditions.

Taxonomy and naming
Verticordia sieberi was first formally described by Johannes Conrad Schauer in 1841 from an unpublished description by Karl Diesing. Schauer's description was published in Monographia Myrtacearum Xerocarpicarum. The specific epithet (sieberi) honours the Austrian botanist Franz Sieber.

In his review of the genus in 1991, Alex George placed this species in subgenus Verticordia, section Verticordia along with V. crebra, V. helichrysantha, V. plumosa, V. stenopetala, V. harveyi, V. pityrhops, and V. fimbrilepis.

George described four varieties:
 Verticordia sieberi var. lomata A.S.George which is similar to var. sieberi but has petals with feathery or hairy edges and leaves less than wide;

Distribution and habitat
This verticordia usually grows in sand, often in areas that are wet in winter, in heath and shrubland. It occurs along the south coast of Western Australia and inland near Frank Hann National Park and between Hyden and Lake King in the Esperance Plains, Jarrah Forest, Coolgardie, and Mallee biogeographic region.

Conservation
Verticordia sieberi var pachyphylla is classified as "Priority One" by the Western Australian Government Department of Parks and Wildlife, meaning that it is known from only one or a few locations which are potentially at risk. The other varieties are classified as "Not Threatened".

Use in horticulture
All the varieties of V. sieberi have proven difficult to propagate and establish in gardens and success in growing the species is rare.

References

sieberi
Rosids of Western Australia
Eudicots of Western Australia
Plants described in 1841